Texas Christian University Press (or TCU Press) is a university press that is part of Texas Christian University. Founded in 1947, the press releases works that focus on the history and culture of Texas and the broader Southwest. It is a member of the Texas Book Consortium, organized by Texas A&M University Press.

External links
Texas Christian University Press
Texas Christian University Press Distributor

References

Press
University presses of the United States
Book publishing companies based in Texas